The Bras du Nord is a tributary of the Sainte-Anne River flowing in the town of Saint-Raymond, in the MRC of Portneuf, in the administrative region of Capitale-Nationale, in Quebec, in Canada.

The Bras du Nord is mainly served by the rang Saguenay road which runs on the east bank of the river.

The main economic activities in the sector are forestry and recreational tourism activities.

The surface of the North Arm (except the rapids zones) is generally frozen from the beginning of December to the end of March, but the safe circulation on the ice is generally made from the end of December to the beginning of March.

Geography 
The Bras du Nord rises at the confluence of the rivers Sainte-Anne Ouest and Neilson (altitude ).

Upper course of the North Arm (segment of )
  first towards the south, then branching south-east to the outlet (coming from the north) of a group of lakes in the hamlet Pine Lake;
  towards the south-east in a deep valley passing between two mountains to the rivière de la Roche Plate (coming from the north);
  forming a large loop to the Écartée river (coming from the northeast);
  by forming three loops towards the west to a road bridge;
  towards the south forming a hook towards the west at the start of the segment and crossing seven series of rapids, up to the Mauvaise River (coming from the southwest);

Lower reaches of the North Arm (segment of )
  to the south by crossing a rapids zone to the Rang Sainte-Croix stream (coming from the southwest);
  towards the south-east, by forming a hook towards the south-west, collecting the discharge (coming from the east) of a lake and bypassing seven small islands, up to at the Noir bridge (route 365);

From this confluence, the current descends on  generally towards the south and the southwest by following the course of the Sainte-Anne river, until the northwest bank of the St. Lawrence River.

Toponymy 
This toponym refers to its location north of the Sainte-Anne river. This toponym appears on the plan of a part of the seigneury of Bourg-Louis carried out by the surveyor Ignace-Pierre Déry, in 1851.

The toponym "Bras du Nord" was formalized on April 22, 2008, at the Place Names Bank of the Commission de toponymie du Québec.

See also 

 Portneuf Regional County Municipality
 Sainte-Anne Ouest River
 Neilson River
 Mauvaise River
 Écartée River
 Sainte-Anne River (Mauricie)
 List of rivers of Quebec

References

Bibliography

External links 
 

Rivers of Capitale-Nationale